The Mamur Zapt is the protagonist of an award-winning series of historical fiction police procedurals, written by Sudanese-born novelist Michael Pearce. The novels are set in Cairo at the turn of the twentieth century. Egypt was ruled notionally by a khedive but the British administered the country at the time. Rather than being a specific person, "Mamur Zapt" was the official title of the head of the Cairo secret police. Pearce filled this role with Gareth Cadwallader Owen, a Welsh army captain.

The first in the series, The Mamur Zapt and the Return of the Carpet, was published in 1988.

As of 2016, there are 19 novels in the Mamur Zapt series.

Titles in the series

References

Police procedurals
Historical fiction
Egypt in fiction
Characters in mystery novel series of the 20th century
Characters in mystery novel series of the 21st century
Fictional historical detectives